The William Bailey House is a historic house located at 176 Cornelia Street in Plattsburgh, Clinton County, New York.

Description and history 
It was built in about 1825 in the “Early Republic” style, and is a -story, five-bay wide, stone-framed building. It features two symmetrical brick end chimneys piercing its gabled roof, and oversized eyebrow windows under the eaves, as well as a one-story wing on one side.

It was listed on the National Register of Historic Places on November 12, 1982.

References

Houses on the National Register of Historic Places in New York (state)
Houses completed in 1825
Houses in Clinton County, New York
National Register of Historic Places in Clinton County, New York
Early Republic architecture in the United States